Ivana Banfić; born 16 November 1969) is a Croatian dancer and pop singer. She became famous under the stage name I BEE in the 1990s during the period of popularity of dance music in Croatia.

Banfić was born in Zagreb. She released her first album in 1991. Her songs were remembered for sexually provocative lyrics and elaborate choreography. Her well-known hit was "Šumica", a song about nude swimming.

She also took part in a hugely successful duet with the Bosnian vocalist Dino Merlin called "Godinama" in 2000, a song which achieved popularity throughout the former Yugoslavia. The song won a Porin Award for Hit of the Year in 2001.

Discography
"Vozy Me Polako" (Suzy), 1991)
"Žena Devedesetih" (Menart, 1999)
"Ona Zna" (Menart, 2001)
"Glamour" (Menart, 2003)
"Vjerujem" (Dallas Records, 2006)
Source: Discogs

References

1969 births
Living people
Musicians from Zagreb
20th-century Croatian women singers
Croatian pop singers
Hayat Production artists